The 2009–10 UEFA Europa League group stage matches took place between 17 September and 17 December 2009.

The group stage featured the 38 winners of the play-off round and the 10 losing sides of the Champions League play-off round.

Following the completion of the group stage, the top two teams in each group advanced to play in the round of 32, where they will be joined by the eight third-placed teams from the Champions League group stage.

Seedings
The draw for the group stage was held in Monaco on 28 August 2009.

Seeding was determined by the UEFA coefficients: Pot 1 held teams ranked 9–32, Pot 2 held teams ranked 35–74, Pot 3 held teams ranked 76–108, while Pot 4 held teams ranked 115–203 and unranked teams.

Clubs from the same association were paired up to split the matchdays between Thursday.

th Title Holder

CL-c Losing teams from the Champions League play-off round (Champions Path)

CL-n Losing teams from the Champions League play-off round (Non-Champions Path)

Tie-breaking criteria
Based on Article 7.05 in the UEFA regulations, if two or more teams are equal on points on completion of the group matches, the following criteria will be applied to determine the rankings:
higher number of points obtained in the group matches played among the teams in question;
superior goal difference from the group matches played among the teams in question;
higher number of goals scored away from home in the group matches played among the teams in question;
superior goal difference from all group matches played;
higher number of goals scored;
higher number of coefficient points accumulated by the club in question, as well as its association, over the previous five seasons.

Groups
All times CET/CEST

Group A

Notes
Note 1: On 29 October 2009, UEFA's Control and Disciplinary Body ruled that Dinamo Zagreb would have to play their next two home matches in the UEFA Europa League behind closed doors due to the actions of their supporters in their match at Timișoara. They also deducted three points from the Croatian club's points tally in Group A. The club appealed, but the appeal was not heard until after the first closed-doors game against Ajax. After the appeal was heard, UEFA replaced the three-point deduction with a €75,000 fine, and a three-year suspended ban from European competition, while the two-match stadium ban remained unchanged.

Group B

Notes
Note 2: Lille played their home group matches in Villeneuve d'Ascq at Stadium Lille-Metropole as Lille's Stade Grimonprez Jooris was left in 2004. In 2012, Stadium Grimonprez Jooris will be replaced definitely by Stade Borne de l'Espoir.

Group C

Notes
Note 3: Rapid Wien played their home group matches at Ernst-Happel-Stadion as it has a greater capacity than their Gerhard Hanappi Stadium.

Group D

Notes
Note 4: Ventspils played their home group matches in Riga at Skonto Stadium as their Ventspils Olimpiskais Stadions did not meet UEFA criteria.

Group E

Notes
Note 5: CSKA Sofia played their home group matches at Vasil Levski National Stadium as their Balgarska Armiya Stadium did not meet UEFA criteria.

Group F

Notes
Note 6: Panathinaikos played their group matches in Athens at Olympic Stadium as Panathinaikos' Apostolos Nikolaidis Stadium had been replaced temporarily by that stadium. In 2010, Apostolos Nikolaidis Stadium will be replaced definitely by Marfin Stadium.
Note 7: Two home matches which Dinamo București had to play behind closed doors because one fan entered the playing field and other fans invaded the running track around the pitch in the play-off round against Slovan Liberec.

Group G

Group H

Notes
Note 8: The second of two home matches which Steaua București had to play behind closed doors because their fans had flown offensive banners to Újpest in the second qualifying round.

Group I

Notes
Note 9: BATE Borisov played their home group matches in Minsk at Dinamo Stadium as their Haradski Stadium did not meet UEFA criteria.

Group J

Group K

Group L

References

External links
2009–10 UEFA Europa League, UEFA.com

Group Stage
2009-10